Olympique de Béja (translated to the Olympic of Béja and often referred to as OB) is a football club from Béja in Tunisia. Founded in 1929. The team plays in red and white colors and its ground is the Municipal stadium of Béja which has a capacity of 15,000 spectators.

Achievements

Performance in national & domestic competitions

Tunisian President Cup: 2
1993, 2010
Finalist: 1995, 1998

Tunisian Super Cup: 1
1995

Tunisian League 1: 0
Best performance: 1997–98 – Fifth

Tunisian League 2: 2
1984–85, 2005–06

Tunisian Leagues Cup: 0
Finalist: 2003, 2004

Performance in CAF competitions
CAF Confederation Cup: 1 appearance
2011 – First Round

CAF Cup Winners' Cup: 2 appearances
1994 – Quarter-Finals
1996 – Second Round

Current squad

Former coaches 

Mustapha Dhib (1956–60)
Ducoussou (1960–62)
Noureddine Ben Mahmoud (1962–65)
Giuseppe Moro (1965–67)
Todor (1967–68)
Skander Medelji (1968–69)
Noureddine Ben Mahmoud (1969–70)
Frank Loscey (1970–71)
Ali Rached (1971–72)
Taoufik Ben Othman (1973–74)
Abderrazak Nouaïli (1974–76)
Slobodan (1976–78)
Ahmed Mghirbi (1978–79)
Jamel Eddine Bouabsa (1979–80)
Mustapha Jouili (1980–81)
Larbi Zouaoui (1981–82)
Apostal (1982–83)
Belhassen Meriah (1983–84)
Mrad Hamza (1984–85)
Ali Selmi (1985–86)
Lotfi Benzarti (1986–88)
Beliakov (1988–89)
Beliakov (1989–90)
Habib Mejri (1990–91)
Amor Dhib (1991–92)
Platek (1992–93)
Riadh Charfi (1993–94)
Alexandru Moldovan (1994–95)
Mokhtar Tlili (1995–96)
Ali Fergani (1996–98)
Abdelghani Djadaoui (1998–99)
Ali Fergani (1999–00)
Fethi Toukabri (2000–01)
Ali Selmi (2001–02)
Ridha Akacha (2002–03)
Kamel Mouassa (2003–04)
Alexandru Moldovan (2004–05)
Fethi Toukabri (2005–06)
Ridha Akacha (2006–07)
Mohamed Kouki (2007–08)
Mahmoud Ouertani (2008–09)
Khaled Ben Sassi (2009)
Rachid Belhout (Oct 3, 2009 – Dec 19, 2010)
Sofiène Hidoussi (Dec 22, 2010 – April 28, 2011)
Hedi Mokraini (April 28, 2011 – Nov 14, 2011)
Said Hammouche (Sept 19, 2011 – Nov 1, 2011)
Amor Dhib (Nov 14, 2011 – March 12, 2012)
Fethi Laabidi (March 12, 2012 – May 8, 2012)
F. Ouerghi (interim) (May 9, 2012 – May 12, 2012)
Kamel Zouaghi (May 13, 2012 – Aug 6, 2012)
Mokhtar Arfaoui (Aug 8, 2012 – Dec 9, 2012)
Kamel Zouaghi (Dec 2012–1?)
Mokhtar Arfaoui (March 8, 2013 – June 30, 2013)
Maher Sdiri (July 14, 2013 – Nov 3, 2013)
H. Habachi (interim) (Nov 5, 2013 – Nov 12, 2013)
Mohamed Kouki (Nov 13, 2013 – June 30, 2014)

Presidents 

Mahmoud M'nakbi (1929–45)
Mohamed Kaoual (1945–53)
Othman Chaouachi (1953–56)
Slaheddine Ben Mbarek (1984–85)
Abdesatar Ben Chiboub (1985–87)
Taieb Gharbi (1987–89)
Hassen Zouaghi (1989–92)
Taieb Gharbi (1992–94)
Faouzi Ben M'barek (1994–96)
Hassen Zouaghi (1996–98)
Abdesatar Ben Chiboub (1998–00)
Taieb Gharbi (2000–01)
Mohamed Brahmi (2001–04)
Mounir Ben Sakhria (2004–05)
Abdeltif Elkefi (2005–06)
Ridha Ouni (2006–08)
Lotfi Kefi (2008–09)
Mokhtar Nefzi (2009–11)
Ali Parnasse (2011–13)

External links
 (En) Club Profile @ WFA

Olympique Béja
Football clubs in Tunisia
Association football clubs established in 1929
1929 establishments in Tunisia
Sports clubs in Tunisia